Zong Xiangqing (born 4 October 1960) is a Chinese fencer. He competed in the individual and team épée events at the 1984 Summer Olympics.

References

1960 births
Living people
Chinese male fencers
Olympic fencers of China
Fencers at the 1984 Summer Olympics
Asian Games medalists in fencing
Fencers at the 1986 Asian Games
Asian Games silver medalists for China
Medalists at the 1986 Asian Games